Charles Grandison Finney (December 1, 1905 – April 16, 1984) was an American news editor and fantasy novelist, the great-grandson of evangelist Charles Grandison Finney. His first novel and most famous work, The Circus of Dr. Lao, won one of the inaugural National Book Awards: the Most Original Book of 1935.

Biography
Finney was born in Sedalia, Missouri, and served in Tientsin, China, with the U.S. Army 15th Infantry Regiment (E Company) from 1927 to 1929.

In his memoirs, he notes that The Circus of Dr. Lao was conceived in Tientsin during 1929. After the Army, he worked as an editor for the Arizona Daily Star in Tucson, Arizona from 1930 to 1970.

Some of Finney's papers, with correspondence and photographs, are collected at the University of Arizona Main Library Special Collections, Collection Number: AZ 024, Papers of Charles G. Finney, 1959-1966. The archive includes typed manuscripts of "A Sermon at Casa Grande", "Isabelle the Inscrutable", "Murder with Feathers", "The Night Crawler", "Private Prince", "An Anabasis in Minor Key", "The Old China Hands", and "The Ghosts of Manacle".

Influence
Finney's work, especially The Circus of Dr.  Lao, has been influential on subsequent writers of fantasy. Ray Bradbury admired the novel and anthologized it in The Circus of Dr. Lao and Other Improbable Stories; Bradbury's Something Wicked This Way Comes shares with Dr.  Lao the setting of a supernatural circus. Arthur Calder-Marshall's The Fair to Middling (1959), Tom Reamy's Blind Voices (1978), Peter S. Beagle's The Last Unicorn (1968) and Jonathan Lethem's Chronic City (2009) were all influenced by Finney's work. 

It was adapted to film as 7 Faces of Dr. Lao.

Selected works

Books
 The Circus of Dr. Lao (1935)
 The Unholy City (1937)
 Past the End of the Pavement (1939), collection
 The Ghosts of Manacle (1964), collection
 The Old China Hands (1961), memoir of service with the Army 15th Infantry in Tientsin, China
 The Magician Out of Manchuria (1968)

Short stories
 "The Iowan's Curse", Harper's Magazine, July 1958
 "The Life and Death of a Western Gladiator", Harper's Magazine, October 1958
 "The Gilashrikes", The Magazine of Fantasy & Science Fiction, October 1959
 "The Night Crawler", The New Yorker, December 5, 1959
 "An Anabasis in Minor Key", The New Yorker, March 26, 1960
 "Private Prince", The New Yorker, June 24, 1961
 "A Sermon at Casa Grande", Point West, September 1963
 "Isabelle the Inscrutable", Harper's Magazine, 228:1367 (April 1964) pp. 51–58
 "Murder with Feathers", Harper's Magazine 232:1391 (April 1966) pp. 112–13

Play
 Project Number Six (1962)

References

Further reading 
 "Charles G. Finney" in Contemporary Authors, published by Thomson Gale

External links
 Charles Grandison Finney at AuthorAndBookInfo.com
 Charles G. Finney at Great SF & Fantasy Works (greatsfandf.com)
 
 
 Charles Grandison Finney Papers at University of Arizona

1905 births
1984 deaths
20th-century American novelists
American fantasy writers
American male journalists
20th-century American journalists
American male novelists
People from Sedalia, Missouri
Novelists from Missouri
National Book Award winners
Place of death missing
American male short story writers
20th-century American short story writers
20th-century American male writers
20th-century American non-fiction writers